is a Japanese tennis player.

Takeuchi has a career high ATP singles ranking of 411 achieved on 29 September 2014. He also has a career high ATP doubles ranking of 503 achieved on 17 March 2014.

Takeuchi made his ATP main draw debut at the 2014 Malaysian Open, Kuala Lumpur where he qualified for the main draw. He defeated Singekrawee Wattanakul and Bumpei Sato. He drew fellow Japanese player Go Soeda in the first round, but lost 2–6, 1–6.

External links
 
 

1987 births
Living people
Japanese male tennis players
Sportspeople from Kyoto
21st-century Japanese people